New Maryland is a suburban bedroom village of Fredericton in central New Brunswick, Canada; located directly south of Fredericton, south of Route 2 and Route 101. As of 2021, the population was 4,153, which means it is large enough to become a "town". New Maryland is one of the wealthiest communities in New Brunswick as it has a median household income of over $110,000, the highest of any municipality in the province.

The name "New Maryland" has been used to describe a farming community and parish for over 100 years. In the 1970s and 1980s, several large suburban subdivisions were constructed in the area. New Maryland was officially incorporated as a village on June 1, 1991. Today the village is home to many businesses including a pub, pharmacy, post office, hairdressers, a vehicle repair shop, and two gas stations along with several more small businesses. New Maryland is also home to New Maryland Elementary School and multiple daycares which serve the village and its outlying areas. Virtually all of the residents now commute to Fredericton.

History

The village gets its name from a settler, Mr. Arnold, who traveled to the area from the state of Maryland, USA in 1817. The area was originally referred to as "Maryland" or "Maryland Hill," but began to be referred to as "New Maryland" in 1825.

New Maryland is the site of the last fatal gun duel in New Brunswick which occurred between George Frederick Street and George Ludlow Wetmore on October 2, 1821 This proclamation appears on the sign for New Maryland on the adjacent Trans-Canada Highway, Route 2. Wetmore Street Pub, which resides within the village, gets its name from the losing opponent of this duel.

Demographics

See also
List of communities in New Brunswick

References

External links 
 Village of New Maryland

Villages in New Brunswick
Communities in York County, New Brunswick
Greater Fredericton